Imavere may refer to the following places in Estonia:

Imavere, Järva County, a village in Järva Parish
Imavere, Saare County, a village in Saaremaa Municipality